Dorcadion nurense is a species of beetle in the family Cerambycidae. It was described by Mikhail Leontievich Danilevsky and Sergey Murzin in 2009. It is known from Iran.

References

nurense
Beetles described in 2009